Szydłów Synagogue was an Orthodox Judaism synagogue in Szydłów, Poland. It was built in 1534–1564 as a fortress synagogue with heavy buttresses on all sides.  The synagogue was devastated by Nazis during World War II. During the war it served as a weapons and food magazine. After the war, it briefly served as a village cinema, but was eventually abandoned.

The building was renovated in the 1960s for use as a library and cultural center.  The women's gallery served as a town library while the main floor was a cultural center.  In 1995 the library was closed due to budget cuts and the building stood in need of repair, especially to the roof, which was leaking.  The renovation altered the building's exterior appearance, but the interior was preserved intact.  The original, built-in, masonry Torah Ark is particularly notable.

The first official inventory of important buildings in Poland, A General View of the Nature of Ancient Monuments in the Kingdom of Poland, led by Kazimierz Stronczynski from 1844 to 1855, describes the Szydłów Synagogue as one of Poland's architecturally notable buildings.

References

20th-century attacks on synagogues and Jewish communal organizations
Former synagogues in Poland
Jewish museums in Poland
16th-century synagogues
Synagogues preserved as museums
Fortress synagogues
Staszów County
Buildings and structures in Świętokrzyskie Voivodeship
Holocaust locations in Poland
Orthodox synagogues in Poland